Mitter Sain Meet (born 20 October 1952) is a Punjabi novelist.

Books

Novels
Below is the list of books written by Meet along with their names in Gurmukhi:

Aag de Beej
Kafla
Tafteesh
Katehra
Sudharghar
Kaorav Sabha

Short stories
Punarwas
Laam
Thos Saboot

Law books
Trial Management
Pro Prosecution Case Law on Custody and Bails
Taftishi Officer dee Kanun Diary (Punjabi)
Faujdari Kanun dee Mudli Jankari (Punjabi)

Awards
2008, Sahitya Akademi Award for his novel Sudhar Ghar.
In 2008,Meet won Pt. Gobind Balab Pant Award from Bureau of Police Research and Development, Govt. of India, New Delhi for his trilogy of novels RAM RAJYA (Hindi).

References

Novelists from Punjab, India
Punjabi-language writers
Recipients of the Sahitya Akademi Award in Punjabi
1952 births
Living people
20th-century Indian novelists
20th-century Indian short story writers
Indian legal writers